Miss Philippines Earth 2017 was the 17th edition of the Miss Philippines Earth pageant. It was held on July 15, 2017 at the Mall of Asia Arena in Pasay, Philippines. Loren Mar Artajos, who assumed the title of Miss Philippines Earth 2016 (after Imelda Schweighart resigned for the organization) crowned Karen Ibasco of Manila at the end of the event. Ibasco represented the Philippines at the Miss Earth 2017 pageant and won.

The announcement of the elemental court was made in random order, since all the titleholders under Miss Philippines Earth are of equal bearing, a first since 2010.

Ibasco won the second crown for Manila, the last time was in 2015 by Angelia Ong. She also made history by becoming the oldest titleholder to hold the Miss Philippines Earth title.

Results
Color keys

Category Results
 Top 15 scorers of each preliminary rounds

Special Awards

Delegates
The following is the list of the 40 official delegates of Miss Philippines Earth 2017 representing various cities, municipalities, provinces, and Filipino communities abroad.

References

External links
 http://www.missphilippines-earth.com/candidates.php

2017
2017 beauty pageants
2017 in the Philippines